Dario Dolci (born 5 March 1947 in Marostica) is a retired Italian professional footballer who played as a defender.

He played six seasons (105 games, no goals) in the Serie A for Varese F.C., A.C. Milan and Ternana Calcio.

Honours
Milan
 Coppa Italia winner: 1972–73.
 UEFA Cup Winners' Cup winner: 1972–73.

External links
 Profile at magliarossonera.it 

1947 births
Living people
Italian footballers
Serie A players
Serie B players
Serie C players
Modena F.C. players
S.S.D. Varese Calcio players
A.C. Milan players
Ternana Calcio players
L.R. Vicenza players
S.P.A.L. players
Savona F.B.C. players
Association football defenders